Shurestan (also Romanized as Shūrestān) is a village in Angut-e Gharbi Rural District, Anguti District, Germi County, Ardabil Province, Iran. At the 2006 census, its population was 111, in 23 families.

References 

Towns and villages in Germi County